The Klaipėda Region or Memel Territory ( or Memelgebiet) was defined by the 1919 Treaty of Versailles in 1920 and refers to the northernmost part of the German province of East Prussia, when as Memelland it was put under the administration of the Entente's Council of Ambassadors. The Memel Territory, together with other areas severed from Germany (the Saar and Danzig) was to remain under the control of the League of Nations until a future day when the people of these regions would be allowed to vote on whether the land would return to Germany or not. Today, the former Memel Territory is controlled by Lithuania as part of Klaipėda and Tauragė counties.

Historical overview 
In 1226 Duke Konrad I of Masovia requested assistance against the Prussians and other Baltic tribes, including the Skalvians who lived along the Neman (Memel) River. In March 1226, Holy Roman Emperor Frederick II issued the Golden Bull of Rimini, which provided that the Teutonic Knights would possess lands taken beyond the Masovian border in exchange for securing Masovia. After uprisings of the Baltic Prussian tribes in 1242 through 1274 failed, the Order conquered many remaining western Balts in Lithuania Minor, including the Skalvians, Nadruvians, and Yotvingians. In 1252 the Order constructed Memel Castle where the Dangė river flows into the Neman, at the north end of the Curonian Spit. In 1422, after centuries of conflict, the Order and the Polish–Lithuanian union signed the Treaty of Melno which defined a border between Prussia and Lithuania. Although Grand Duke Vytautas of Lithuania wanted the border to be coextensive with the Neman River, the treaty border started north of Memelberg and ran southeasterly to the Neman. This border remained until 1918. After the Treaty of Melno was signed, many Lithuanians returned to northeastern Prussia, which became known as Lithuania Minor in the 16th century.

After World War I ended in 1918, the Klaipėda Region was defined as a roughly triangular wedge, with the northern border being the Treaty of Melno border, the southern border following the Neman River, and on the west abutting the Baltic Sea. In 1923, fearing that the western powers would create a free state, Lithuanians took control of the region and, as part of larger regional negotiations, incorporated the region into the State of Lithuania. In March 1939 Lithuania acquiesced to Nazi demands and transferred the Klaipėda Region to Germany. As World War II came to an end in 1945, the Soviet Union incorporated the region into the Lithuanian SSR. Since 1990 the area of the Klaipėda Region has formed part of the independent Republic of Lithuania, as part of Klaipėda and Tauragė counties. The southern border established by the Treaty of Versailles defines the current international boundary between Lithuania and the Kaliningrad Oblast of the Russian Federation.

Timeline

Treaty of Versailles

The eastern boundaries of Prussia (from 1871, part of the German Empire), having remained unchanged since the Treaty of Melno in 1422, became a matter of discussion following World War I, as the newly independent states of Poland and Lithuania emerged. The separatist Act of Tilsit was signed by few pro-Lithuanian oriented Prussian Lithuanians in 1918, demanding the unification of Prussian Lithuania with Lithuania proper. It is traditionally viewed by Lithuanians as expressing the desire of Lithuania Minor to unite with Lithuania – but the majority of Prussian Lithuanians did not want to join with Lithuania and the Prussian Lithuanians did not make up a majority of the population.

The division of Prussia was also promoted by Poland's Roman Dmowski in Versailles who acted by orders of Józef Piłsudski: the purpose was to give the lower part of Neman River and its delta, which was located in Germany and called the Memel River, to Lithuania as this would provide her access to the Baltic Sea, while Lithuania itself should be part of Poland. These ideas were supported by the French prime minister Georges Clemenceau.

In 1920, according to the Treaty of Versailles, the German area north of the Memel river was given the status of Territoire de Memel under the administration of the Council of Ambassadors, and French troops were sent for protection. During the period of French administration, the idea of an independent State of Memelland grew in popularity among local inhabitants. The organisation Deutsch-Litauischer Heimatbund (German-Lithuanian homeland federation) promoted the idea of a Freistaat Memelland, which later should return to Germany. It had 30,000 members, both ethnic Germans and Lithuanians, about 21% of the total population.

Lithuanian takeover

On 9 January 1923, three years after the Versailles Treaty had become effective, Lithuania occupied the territory during the Klaipėda Revolt, mainly by militia that had entered the region from Lithuania. France at the same time had started the Occupation of the Ruhr in Germany, and the French administration in Memel did not take any significant counteractive measures against the rebels. On 19 January, the territory was annexed by Lithuania, and the fait accompli was eventually confirmed by the Council of Ambassadors in 1924.

Autonomous region within Lithuania
In the Klaipėda Convention, signed by the Council of Ambassadors and Lithuania, the area was granted a separate parliament, two official languages, the capacity to raise its own taxes, charge custom duties, and manage its cultural and religious affairs, and was allowed a separate judicial system, separate citizenship, internal control of agriculture and forestry, as well as a separate social security system. The Council of Ambassadors accepted the resulting arrangement and confirmed the autonomy of the region within the Republic of Lithuania. On 8 May 1924 a further Convention on the Klaipėda region confirmed the annexation, and a resulting autonomy agreement was signed in Paris. The Memel Territory was recognized as an integral part of the Republic of Lithuania also by the Weimar Republic on 29 January 1928, when the two countries signed the Lithuanian-German Border Treaty.

Importantly, the annexation gave Lithuania control of a year-round ice-free Baltic port. Lithuania made full use of Klaipėda's port, modernizing and adapting it, largely for its agricultural exports. The port reconstruction was certainly one of the larger long-term investment projects enacted by the government of Lithuania in the interwar period.

The inhabitants of the area were not given a choice on the ballot whether they wanted to be part of the Lithuanian state or part of Germany. Since the pro-German political parties had an overall majority of more than 80% in all elections to the local parliament (see election statistics below) in the interwar period, there can be little doubt that such a referendum would have been in favour of Germany. In fact, the area had been united since the monastic state of the 13th century, and even many Lithuanian-speakers, regarding themselves as East Prussians, declared themselves as "Memellanders/Klaipėdiškiai" in the official census (see below for demographic information) and did not want to belong to a Lithuanian national state. According to the Lithuanian point of view, Memellanders were viewed as Germanised Lithuanians who should be re-Lithuanised.

There was also a strong denominational difference since about 95% of the inhabitants of Lithuania Minor were Lutherans while more than 90% of Greater Lithuanians were Catholics. Following the Agreement concerning the Evangelical Church of the Klaipėda Region of July 23, 1925, concluded between the Directorate of the Klaipėda Region and the Evangelical Church of the old-Prussian Union, a church of united administration of Lutheran and Reformed congregations, the mostly Lutheran congregations (and a single Reformed one in Klaipėda) in the Klaipėda Region were disentangled from the old-Prussian Ecclesiastical Province of East Prussia and formed the Regional Synodal Federation of the Memel Territory (Landessynodalverband Memelgebiet) since, being ranked an old-Prussian ecclesiastical province of its own. An own consistory in Klaipėda was established in 1927, led by a general superintendent (at first F. Gregor, elected in 1927, succeeded by O. Obereiniger, elected by the regional synod in 1933). The Catholic parishes in the Klaipėda Region used to belong to the Bishopric of Ermland until 1926 and were then disentangled, forming the new Territorial Prelature of Klaipėda under Prelate Justinas Staugaitis.

The government of Lithuania faced considerable opposition from the region's autonomous institutions, among others the Parliament of the Klaipėda Region. As years passed, claims were becoming more and more vocal about a re-integration into a resurgent Germany. It was only during the latter period that Lithuania then instituted a policy of "Lithuanization". This was met by even more opposition, as religious and regional differences slowly became insurmountable.

After the December 1926 coup d'état, Antanas Smetona came to power. As the status of the Memel Territory was regulated by international treaties, the Memel Territory became an oasis of democracy in Lithuania. Lithuanian intelligentsia often held marriages in Memel/Klaipėda, since Memel Territory was the only place in Lithuania where civil marriage was in use, in the rest of Lithuania only church marriages were legitimized. Thus, Lithuanian opposition to Smetona's regime was also based in Memel Territory.

At the start of the 1930s, certain leaders and members of pro-Nazi organizations in the region were put on trial by Lithuania "for crimes of terrorism". The 1934–5 trial of Neumann and Sass in Kaunas can be presented as the first anti-Nazi trial in Europe. Three members of the organizations were sentenced to death, and their leaders imprisoned. Following political and economic pressure from Germany, most were later released.

Election results for the local parliament
The local parliament had 29 seats, one for every 5,000 inhabitants. Men and women from age 23 had the right to vote.

See also the results of the January 1919 elections to the Nationalversammlung.

Demographic data
A Lithuanian census carried out in the region in 1925 found its total population was 141,000. Declared language was used to classify the inhabitants, and on this basis 43.5 percent were German, 27.6 percent were Lithuanian, and 25.2 percent were "Klaipėdan" (Memeländisch). Other sources give the interwar ethnic composition as 41.9 percent German, 27.1 percent Memeländisch, and 26.6 percent Lithuanian.

Overall, Prussian Lithuanians were more rural than Germans; the part of Lithuanian speakers in the city of Klaipėda itself increased over time due to urbanization and migration from villages into cities and later also from remaining Lithuania (in the city of Klaipėda, Lithuanian-speaking people made up 21.5% in 1912, 32.6% in 1925 and 38.7% in 1932*). Foreign citizens might include some Germans, who opted for German citizenship instead of Lithuanian (although at the time the German government pressured local Germans to take Lithuanian citizenship, so that German presence would remain). There were more Lithuanian speakers in the north of the region (Klaipėdos apskritis and Šilutės apskritis) than in the south (Pagėgių apskritis). Other locals included people of other nationalities who had citizenship of Lithuania, such as Jews.

In the 1930s, a novel by local author Ieva Simonaitytė based on family history illustrated the centuries-old German–Lithuanian relations in the region.

The authoritarian regime of A. Smetona enforced a policy of discrimination and Lithuanisation: it sent administrators from Lithuania, and German teachers, officials and priests were fired from jobs. Local inhabitants—both Germans and Prussian Lithuanians—were not accepted for state service in Memel Territory. People were sent from Kaunas instead.

Until 1938, no Governor was appointed from local Prussian Lithuanians. This policy led Prussian Lithuanian intelligentsia and some local Germans to organise a society in 1934 to oppose Lithuanian rule. This group was soon dismantled.

Election results in Memel Territory were irritating for the authoritarian Smetona regime, and it attempted to "colonise" Memel Territory with Lithuanians. The Lithuanian settlements Jakai and Smeltė were built. The number of newcomers increased: in 1926 the number was 5,000, in 1939–30,000.

Lithuania introduced a hard-line Lithuanisation campaign that led to even deeper antagonism between local Prussian Lithuanians, Memellanders, Germans and newcomers.

German ultimatum

By late 1938, Lithuania had lost control of the situation in the Territory. In the early hours of 23 March 1939, after an oral ultimatum had caused a Lithuanian delegation to travel to Berlin, the Lithuanian Minister of Foreign Affairs Juozas Urbšys and his German counterpart Joachim von Ribbentrop signed the Treaty of the Cession of the Memel Territory to Germany in exchange for a Lithuanian Free Zone for 99 years in the port of Memel, using the facilities erected in previous years.

Hitler had anticipated this aboard a Kriegsmarine naval ship and at dawn sailed into Memel to celebrate the return heim ins Reich of the Memelland. This proved to be the last of a series of bloodless annexations of territories separated from the German or Austrian Empire by the Treaty of Versailles, which had been perceived by many Germans as a humiliation. German forces seized the territory even before the official Lithuanian ratification. The United Kingdom and France, as after the revolt of 1923, took no action. It was under these conditions that the Seimas was forced to approve the treaty, hoping that Germany would not press any other territorial demands upon Lithuania.

Still, the reunion with Germany was welcomed by the majority of the population, both by Germans and by Memelanders.

According to the treaty, the citizens of the Memel Territory were allowed to choose their citizenship: either German or Lithuanian. 303 people or, counting family members, 585, asked for Lithuanian citizenship but only 20 requests were granted. Another term stated that persons who had settled in the Memel Territory during the occupation period from 1923 to 1939 should emigrate. About 8,900 Lithuanians did so. At the same time, Germany expelled about 1,300 local Memel and Lithuanian Jews and about 40 Prussian Lithuanians.

Politics

Governors
High Commissioners
Dominique Joseph Odry, France (15 February 1920 – 1 May 1921)
Jean Gabriel Petisné, France (1 May 1921 – 19 February 1923)

Plenipotentiaries
Jonas Polovinskas-Budrys, Lithuania (19 February 1923 – 24 February 1923) (acting)
Antanas Smetona, Lithuania (24 February 1923 – 27 October 1924)

Governors
Jonas Polovinskas-Budrys (27 October 1924 – 8 November 1925)
Jonas Žilius (8 November 1925 – 1 August 1926)
Karolis Žalkauskas (1 August 1926 – 1 November 1927)
Antanas Merkys (1 November 1927 – 19 May 1932)
Vytautas Jonas Gylys (19 May 1932 – 25 November 1933)
Jonas Navakas (25 November 1933 – 5 February 1935)
Vladas Kurkauskas (5 February 1935 – 15 October 1936)
Jurgis Kubilius (15 October 1936 – 12 December 1938)
Viktoras Gailius (12 December 1938 – 22 March 1939)

Transitional Commissioner for the Integration of Memelland
Erich Koch (23 March 1939 – 30 April 1939)

Directorate

World War II and after

After Nazi Germany took over the area in 1939, many Lithuanians and their organizations began leaving Memel and the surrounding area. Memel was quickly turned into a fortified naval base by the Germans. After the failure of the German invasion of the USSR the fate of East Prussia and Memel was sealed. By October 1944 the inhabitants of the area, without ethnic distinction, had to make a decision whether to stay or leave. Nearly all of the population were evacuated from the approaching Red Army, but the city itself was defended by the German army during the Battle of Memel until January 28, 1945. After its capture only six persons were found in the city.

At the end of the war, the majority of the inhabitants had fled to the West to settle in Germany. Still in 1945–46 there were around 35,000 local inhabitants, both Prussian Lithuanians and Germans. The government of the Lithuanian SSR sent agitators into the displaced persons camps to make promises to former inhabitants that they could return and their property would be restored. In the period of 1945–50 about 8,000 persons were repatriated. Bilingual Lithuanian-German returners were viewed as Germans.

The few remaining ethnic Germans were then forcibly expelled, with most opting to flee to what would become West Germany. Indigenous people who remained in the former Memel territory were dismissed from their jobs. Families of notable local Lithuanians, who had opposed German parties before the war, were deported to Siberia. In 1951 the Lithuanian SSR expelled 3,500 people from the former Memel Territory to East Germany. In 1958, when emigration was allowed, the majority of the surviving population, both Germans and Prussian Lithuanians, emigrated to West Germany; this event was called a repatriation of Germans by the Lithuanian SSR. Today these formerly Lutheran territories are mostly inhabited by Lithuanians who are Catholic and by Orthodox Russians. However, the minority Prussian Lithuanian Protestants historically were concentrated in these regions, and some remain to this day. Only a few thousand natives are left. Their continued emigration is facilitated by the fact they are considered German citizens by the Federal Republic of Germany. No property restoration was performed by the Republic of Lithuania for owners prior to 1945.

Although maintaining that the Memel Territory in 1939 was re-annexed by Germany and acknowledging that Lithuania itself was occupied in 1940 by the Soviets, Lithuania, after regaining independence on 11 March 1990, did not restore autonomy to the Memel Territory.

See also
 Areas annexed by Nazi Germany
 Memel Agricultural Party
 Klaipėda town
 The Lithuanian–Belorussian Soviet Socialist Republic (A.K.A. Litbel)
 The Republic of Central Lithuania
 The 1922 Republic of Central Lithuania general election
 Vilnius, the capital city of Lithuania

References

External links

 Joachim Tauber: Das Memelgebiet (1919–1944) in der deutschen und litauischen Historiographie nach 1945 
 Local heritage book Memelland
 STATUT DU TERRITOIRE DE MEMEL 
 Map of languages in East Prussia in 1900 (larger) 
 German translation of the Commission Report to the Council of Ambassadors 
 German translation of Vygantas Vareikis' thesis Die Rolle des Schützenbundes Litauens bei der Besetzung des Memelgebietes 1923 
 

 
Historical regions in Lithuania
Geographic history of Germany
History of Lithuania (1918–1940)
Geography of Prussia
Treaty of Versailles
States and territories established in 1920
League of Nations mandates
1920 establishments in Europe
1920 disestablishments in Europe
States and territories disestablished in 1923